Sursilvan (also romontsch sursilvan ; Sursilvan, Vallader, Surmiran, Sutsilvan, and Rumantsch Grischun: sursilvan; Puter: sursilvaun) is a group of dialects of the Romansh language spoken in the Swiss district of Surselva. It is the most widely spoken variety of Romansh with 17,897 people within the Surselva District (54.8%) naming Romansh as a habitually spoken language in the Swiss census of 2000. The most closely related variety is Sutsilvan, which is spoken in the area located to the east of the district.

The name of the dialect and the Surselva District is derived from  'above' and  'forest', with the forest in question being the Uaul Grond in the area affected by the Flims Rockslide. The word  itself has fallen out of use in modern Sursilvan, with the most common word for forest being , an Old High German loanword.  is only used for in a few more recent terms such as  'forestry',  'forest officer', or  'Long-eared owl'.

Distribution 

Sursilvan is used across most of the Surselva District, with the exception of the Walser villages of Obersaxen, Vals, St. Martin and Safiental. Outside of the Surselva District, Flims is also part of the Sursilvan dialect area. In addition, Sursilvan was previously used as the written Romansh language of parts of the Sutsilvan dialect area. When a separate Sutsilvan written language was introduced in 1944, the villages of Bonaduz, Rhäzüns, Domat/Ems and Trin retained Sursilvan as their written language. In addition, Sursilvan was previously used in the Surmiran dialect area as the language of church, but has now been replaced by Standard Surmiran and Rumantsch Grischun.

Most municipalities in which Sursilvan is the traditional language still have a Romansh-speaking majority today. The exceptions are Flims, Laax, Schnaus, Ilanz, Castrisch, Surcuolm, and Duvin. In all of these, except for Flims, however, a majority of people reported using Romansh daily in the 2000 Swiss census, even if only a minority named it as their language of best command. In about half of the Sursilvan villages, Romansh is the language of best command of over 70% or 80%. The highest percentage is found in Vrin with over 95%. As a daily language, it is used in nearly all municipalities by at least 70%, in about half by more than 80%, and in a third by over 90%. Overall across the Sursilvan dialect area, in the census of 2000, 70.1% named Romansh as a habitually used language, while 58.3% named it as their language of best command.

Orthography 

Sursilvan spelling mostly follows a phonemic system.

Morphology

Nouns 

Sursilvan nouns distinguish two genders (masculine and feminine) and two numbers (singular and plural).

Nouns in -a are overwhelmingly feminine (with few exceptions such as duca 'duke'). Nouns in consonants or other vowels can be either masculine or feminine.

Plurals are formed with the suffix -s. Nouns already ending in -s do not add this plural ending, but nouns in -z and -sch follow the general rule. Nominalised past participles in -au have a plural in -ai. In addition, nouns may show vowel alternations or other irregularities:

Collective plurals 
In addition to the normal plural in -s many nouns also show a collective plural in -a. These forms typically occur with natural substances (rocks, wood, plants etc.) and human body parts. Syntactically these collective plurals behave like feminine singular nouns: La crappa ei dira. 'The rocks are hard. / The rock (= material) is hard.' (with f.sg. dira 'hard' agreeing with the subject la crappa 'the ') and may best be considered as an intermediate formation between inflection and derivation.

Articles 
Sursilvan has both a definite and an indefinite article. These are preposed and agree with their noun in gender and number. (The indefinite article only has singular forms.) Forms may differ depending on whether the following word starts with a vowel or a consonant:

Indefinite Article

Definite Article 

The definite article contracts with a number of prepositions:

Adjectives 
The adjective agrees with its noun in gender and number and (as in other Romance languages) usually follows it.

A peculiarity of Sursilvan is that the adjective distinguishes an attributive and a predicative form in the masculine singular:

in um vegl 'an old man'
igl um ei vegls 'the man is old'

The predicative masculine singular form is morphologically identical with the masculine plural.

The ending of the masculine plural is -s. Feminine adjectives suffix -a in the singular and -as in the plural. 
The attributive masculine singular often differs from the other forms in its vocalism.

Pronouns

Personal pronouns 

 Modern Sursilvan has no unstressed proclitic personal pronouns appearing in preverbal position (as in French  'I have seen him') and only uses the (historically) stressed forms, which appear in the same position as nouns:  'I have seen him'.
 In the 1Sg and 2Sg the special dative forms  and  exist, which are used after the preposition  'to'.
 In the 3rd person Sursilvan has a neuter pronoun  ( before  'is'):  'it rains',  'it is late'. This pronoun is also used as an expletive pronoun in sentences like  'there emerges [lit: it comes out] a dragon with seven heads'. The same form can be used with 3Pl verb forms as a gender-neutral 'they/people' (French , German ):  'they/people say'.

Demonstrative pronouns 

 The proximal pronoun  'this' and the distal pronoun  'that' have different forms in the masc. sg. depending on whether they are used adjectivally with a noun or pronominally on their own (referring to a masculine noun):  'he goes to this old man, and this one says...'.
 , which in other Rhetoromance dialects serves as proximal demonstrative, is in modern Sursilvan limited to fixed expression such  'this year',  'this evening'.

Sample 
The fable The Fox and the Crow by Jean de La Fontaine in Sursilvan, as well as a translation into English, the similar-looking but noticeably different-sounding dialect Sutsilvan, and Rumantsch Grischun.

References

Bibliography 
 Bernardi, Rut, & H. Stricker, & Società Retorumantscha, & Verein für Bündner Kulturforschung (1994), Handwörterbuch des Rätoromanischen : Wortschatz aller Schriftsprachen, einschliesslich Rumantsch Grischun, mit Angaben zur Verbreitung und Herkunft; erarbeitet auf Initiative von Hans Stricker ; herausgegeben von der Società Retorumantscha und dem Verein für Bündner Kulturforschung. Zürich: Offizin.
 Cahannes, Gion, & Ligia romontscha (1924), Grammatica romontscha per Surselva e Sutselva, Ediziun della Ligia romontscha. Mustér: Stampa da G. Condrau.
 Da Sale, Flaminio (1729), Fundamenti principali della lingua retica, o griggiona, con le regole del declinare i nomi, e congiugare i verbi, all'uso di due delle principali valli della Rezia, cioe di Sopraselva e di Sorset che può servire alli italiani per imparare [...], Disentis : Francesco Antonio Binn. [Online: copy (1), copy (2).]
 Decurtins, Alexis (2001), Niev vocabulari romontsch sursilvan - tudestg / Neues rätoromanisches Wörterbuch surselvisch-deutsch, Chur. .
 Eichenhofer, Wolfgang (1999), Historische Lautlehre des Bünderromanischen. Tübingen: Francke.
 Gartner, Theodor (1883), Raetoromanische Grammatik. (Sammlung romanischer Grammatiken.) Heilbronn: Gebr. Henninger. [Online: copy (1), copy (2), copy (3).]
 Gregor, D.B. (1982), Romontsch : Language and literature : The sursilvan Raeto-Romance of Switzerland. (Oleander language and literature ; 11). Cambridge: Oleander.
 
 Janzing, Gereon (2006), Rätoromanisch Wort für Wort, Reise Know-How Verlag Rump.  (Deals in spite of its title only with Sursilvan).
 Liver, Ricarda (1982). Manuel pratique de romanche : Sursilvan-vallader : Précis de grammaire suivi d'un choix de textes. (Romanica Raetica ; t. 4). Chur: Ligia Romontscha.
 
 Lutz, Florentin, & Dieter Strehle (1988), Rückläufiges Wörterbuch des Surselvischen = Dicziunari invers dil romontsch sursilvan. (Romanica Monacensia ; 29). Tübingen: Narr.
 Nay, Sep Modest, & Ramun Vieli, & Ligia romontscha (1948), Lehrbuch der rätoromanischen Sprache (deutsch-surselvisch). (2. Aufl. / im Auftrage der Ligia Romontscha besorgt von Ramun Vieli. ed.). [Chur]: Ligia Romontscha.
 Spescha, Arnold (1989), Grammatica sursilvana, Lehrmittelverlag Graubünden, Chur. (This grammar is entirely written in Romansh.)
 Vieli, Ramun (1938), Vocabulari scursaniu romontsch-tudestg, redigius da dr. Ramun Vieli. Ediziun della Ligia romontscha 1938. Mustér: G. Condrau.
 Vieli/Decurtins (1994), Vocabulari tudestg - romontsch sursilvan, Lia Rumantscha.

Sursilvan literature is published among others by the Lia Rumantscha in Chur.

External links 
 Crestomazia Retorumantscha Digitala / Digitale Rätoromanische Chrestomathie
 MyPledari. Pledari rumantsch-englais. English-Romansh Dictionary.
 Niev vocabulari Sursilvan ONLINE

Romansh dialects
Languages of Switzerland